AGL may refer to:

Businesses
 AGL Energy, Australian energy company, successor to Australian Gas Light Company
 AGL Resources, an American utility company
 Atlanta Gas Light, a subsidiary of AGL Resources
 Australian Gas Light Company, a former Australian energy company

Science and technology

Biology
 AGL gene, which codes for human glycogen debranching enzyme
 amylo- α- 1,6- glucosidase, 4- α- glucanotransferase (AGL), another name for the glycogen debranching enzyme

Computing
 A Graphics Language, BASIC language extension for control of Hewlett-Packard plotters
 Adobe Glyph List, a list of glyph names for Unicode characters
 Apple Graphics Library, the Apple API for OpenGL
 Automotive Grade Linux, an open operating system and framework for automotive applications

Other uses in science and technology
 Above ground level, in aviation
 Affine general linear group, a group of affine transformations in mathematics
 Artificial grammar learning, an investigative technique in cognitive psychology and linguistics
 Automatic Grenade Launcher, weapon for shooting grenades rapidly

Other uses
 AGL, the United States Navy hull classification symbol for a lighthouse tender
 Abergele & Pensarn railway station, UK (National Rail code AGL)
 Angola, ITU letter code
 Fembe language (ISO 639-3 code agl)
 "Animism: the Gods' Lake", a fictional location in Animism (TV series)